Geeta Phogat (born 15 December 1988) is a freestyle wrestler who won India's first ever gold medal in wrestling at the Commonwealth Games in 2010. She is also the first Indian female wrestler to have qualified for the Olympic Summer Games.

Personal life and family 

Geeta Phogat was born in Balali village of Charkhi Dadri district, Haryana.  Her father Mahavir Singh Phogat, a former wrestler himself and a Dronacharya Award recipient, is also her coach.

Her sister Babita Kumari and cousin Vinesh Phogat are also Commonwealth Games gold medalists. Both won gold medals in their respective categories in 2014 edition of Commonwealth Games. Another younger sister of Geeta Phogat, Ritu Phogat, too is an international level wrestler and has won a gold medal at the 2016 Commonwealth Wrestling Championship. Her youngest sister, Sangita Phogat is also a wrestler.

She married fellow wrestler Pawan Kumar on 20 November 2016. The couple had their first child, a boy, in December 2019.

Career

2009 Commonwealth Wrestling Championship 
Phogat won the gold  medal at the Commonwealth Wrestling Championship held in Jalandhar, Punjab between 19 and 21 December 2009.

2010 Commonwealth Games 
She won India’s first ever gold medal in women’s wrestling at the Commonwealth Games held in New Delhi, beating Emily Bensted from Australia in the gold medal match with a score of 1-0, 7-0.

2012 Summer Olympics 
Phogat won a gold medal in the Wrestling FILA Asian Olympic Qualification Tournament that concluded at Almaty, Kazakhstan in April 2012. She has undergone rigorous training at the Netaji Subhas National Institute of Sports, (NSNIS), Patiala, under the guidance of chief coach O.P. Yadav and foreign expert Ryan Dobo.

Phogat was beaten in her opening fight by Canadian Tonya Verbeek (1–3). She received a chance to win the bronze medal since the Canadian went to the finals. In the repechage round, she lost her first match to Lazareva from Ukraine.

2012 World Wrestling Championships 
In the 2012 World Wrestling Championships held in Canada, Phogat won the bronze medal.

In the first round, Phogat faced Maria Gurova of Russia, beating her 3:1. The second round brought a 5:0 loss for Phogat against Saori Yoshida of Japan. With the Japanese grappler making the finals, Phogat contested in the repechage round, first against Akziya Dautbayeva of Kazakhstan whom she beat 3:1 and then winning the bronze medal bout 3:0 against Natalya Sinishin of Ukraine.

2012 Asian Wrestling Championships 
In the first round of the 2012 Asian Wrestling Championships, Phogat lost to her Japanese opponent Kanako Murata in a 5:0 scoreline. With the Japanese grappler entering the finals, Phogat was able to contest in the bronze medal round and won the bronze medal in the 55 kg beating Sumiya Erdenechimeg from Mongolia 3:1.

2013 Commonwealth Wrestling Championships 
At the tournament held in Johannesburg, South Africa, Phogat finished second and won the silver medal in the women's freestyle 59 kg category after losing the final bout to Oluwafunmilayo Adeniyi of Nigeria.

2015 Asian Wrestling Championships
At the 2015 Asian Wrestling Championships in Doha, Phogat finished third, winning the bronze medal in the freestyle 58 kg category along with Aiym Abdildina of Kazakhstan. At the 2015 World Championships in Las Vegas, she was drawn against nine-time world Champion, the Japanese Kaori Icho, and lost to her in the opening round 0–10. With Icho qualifying for the finals, Phogat was given a chance to contest in the repechage for the bronze medal. She again lost 0–10 to her opponent, Elif Jale Yeşilırmak of Turkey.

Popular culture 
Aamir Khan's film Dangal is loosely based on Geeta Phogat and her sister's lives. Her role in the movie is played by Fatima Sana Shaikh and her younger self is played by Zaira Wasim. Wrestler Pooja Dhanda was screened and selected to play the role of Babita Phogat in this movie, which she could not play due to an injury, and later she went on to defeat senior Phogat sister Geeta Phogat in the real life national championship.

Other titles 
 Dave Schultz Memorial Tournament, 2013 – Silver
 Dave Schultz Memorial Tournament, 2014 – Bronze

References

External links 
 
 
 Geeta Phogat in Rediff.com

Indian female sport wrestlers
Wrestlers at the 2010 Commonwealth Games
Commonwealth Games gold medallists for India
Sportswomen from Haryana
People from Bhiwani
Wrestlers at the 2012 Summer Olympics
Olympic wrestlers of India
Recipients of the Arjuna Award
1988 births
Wrestlers at the 2010 Asian Games
World Wrestling Championships medalists
Commonwealth Games medallists in wrestling
21st-century Indian women
21st-century Indian people
Living people
Female sport wrestlers from Haryana
Geeta
Fear Factor: Khatron Ke Khiladi participants
Asian Games competitors for India
Asian Wrestling Championships medalists
Medallists at the 2010 Commonwealth Games